Elections to Gosport Council in Hampshire, England were held on 1 May 2008.  Half of the council was up for election and the council stayed under no overall control.

Before the election the Labour and Liberal Democrat parties had held power on the council with the casting vote of the mayor. The election saw the Liberal Democrats close the gap with the Conservative party after making 5 gains, while the Labour party lost four of the five seats they had held. However following the election the Conservative party said that they would take charge of the council as they remained the largest party.

After the election, the composition of the council was
Conservative 16
Liberal Democrat 14
Labour 4

Election result

Ward results

Alverstoke

Anglesey

Bridgemary North

Bridgemary South

Brockhurst

Christchurch

Elson

Forton

Grange

Hardway

Lee East

Lee West

Leesland

Peel Common

Privett

Rowner and Holbrook

Town

References

2008 Gosport election result
Ward results

2008
2008 English local elections
2000s in Hampshire